A munchy box or munchie box is an inexpensive fast-food product sold from takeaway restaurants, primarily in Scotland and Glasgow in particular, but also in many other parts from Aberdeen to Rothesay. They are also now sold by many takeaways across the UK. It consists of an assortment of fast foods served in a large pizza box.

Ingredients and nutrition
The contents of a munchy box vary but may typically include kebab meat, fried chicken, pizza, chicken tikka, samosas, onion rings, chow mein noodles, pakora, naan bread, garlic bread, coleslaw, other fast foods and sauces such as curry sauce. There is sometimes a salad item and, invariably, chips or fried rice. While it is not clear whether a munchy box is actually intended to be consumed as a meal for one, there has been concern at the health implications if it is consumed in this way.

There have been reports of healthier options of munchy boxes. The healthy option might be composed of tortillas, cherry tomatoes, a salad, boiled eggs, sliced gammons, raw red onions, nachos, chicken mayo, a sprinkling of cheese and other healthy foods. Sushi is sometimes included in the healthier option.

Criticism 
The combination of very large portions and a low price has made the munchy box popular; however, its contents, consisting mostly of deep fried or fatty foods, have led to health concerns among some Scottish politicians and health campaigners, particularly if consumed by children. Glasgow City Council has undertaken nutritional analysis of munchy boxes on sale in the west of Scotland with the intention of encouraging restaurants to include healthier ingredients and reduce portion sizes.

See also

 Halal snack pack
 Kapsalon
 Scottish cuisine
 Glasgow effect
 Bento (A Japanese packaged lunch box typically featuring an assortment of food)
Garbage plate

References

External links
 What is a Munchy Box?

Scottish cuisine
Fast food